Agnoli is an Italian surname. Notable people with the surname include:

Johannes Agnoli (1925–2003), German-Italian political scientist
Valerio Agnoli (born 1985), Italian bicycle racer

See also
Agnolin
Agnolo (disambiguation)

Italian-language surnames